Run If You Can is a 2010 German drama film directed by Dietrich Brüggemann.

Cast 
 Robert Gwisdek as Ben
 Jacob Matschenz as Christian
 Anna Brüggemann as Annika
  as Arzt
  as Lisa
 Franziska Weisz as Mareike

References

External links 

2010 drama films
2010 films
German drama films
Films about paraplegics or quadriplegics
2010s German films